The Merciful Crow is a fantasy novel by Margaret Owen. It was released in 2019, and published by Henry Holt and Company. Its sequel is The Faithless Hawk.

The Merciful Crow is set in the fictional land of Sabor. Society is governed by a monarchy and is split into a caste system. Each caste has its own unique birthright magical ability that is innately present in every person born into a specific caste. Within each caste, there are a select few known as 'witches', individuals who possess a more potent version of their respective caste birthrights. The caste system is divided into 5 categories: Phoenix, Splendid, Hunting, Common, and Crow. The Phoenix caste only consists of Phoenixes whose birthright is fire and are the ruling family of Sabor. In the Splendid Caste there are Peacocks whose birthright is of glamour, Swans whose birthright is desire, and Doves whose birthright is artistry. In the Hunting caste there are Hawks whose birthright is blood/healing, Cranes whose birthright is the truth, Owls whose birthright is memory, and Vultures whose birthright is hunting. In the Common caste there are Gulls whose birthright is the wind, Pigeons whose birthright is luck, and Sparrows whose birthright is refuge/hiding. Lastly, there is the Crow caste which only consists of the Crows who have no birthright. Instead, they are immune towards the sinners plague, a highly contagious and incurable disease that has ravaged Sabor for centuries. Due to their immunity, they offer mercy for those who are suffering from the plague and safely dispose of the bodies. Furthermore, crow witches are able to harness the latent magic within the teeth or bones of other caste members and make use of the birthright abilities from other caste members. Due to their association with the Sinner's Plague and their ability to 'steal' others' birthrights, Crows are stigmatized and ostracized by the other members of society. The story follows a Phoenix, a Hawk, and a Crow.

Plot 

Fie abides by one rule: look after your own. As the future chieftain of the shunned caste of mercy-killers, she relies on her wits and bone magic -drawn from the teeth of dead witches and only used by Crow witches -to protect her band of fellow Crows. The Crows take more abuse than coin, so when they're called to collect the royal dead, Fie hopes they'll find the payout of a lifetime. When Fie discovers that Crown Prince Jasimir and his bodyguard, Tavin, have faked their deaths to escape the ruthless Queen Rhusana, she's ready to cut her loses -and perhaps their throats. But Jas offers a deal that she can't refuse: make sure he lives to see the throne, and he'll protect the Crows when he reigns. For the Crows have been seen as less than dirt for a long time, having protection would be priceless for the Crow caste. Their best bet would be to meet up with a cousin of Prince Jasimir's to rally the public against Rhusana. However, after Hangdog, one of the members of their Crow band, betrays them for a hopeless endeavor of moving up in the caste system, the band of crows splits up so Jasimir and Tavin have their best shot at reaching their destination, Fie has the solo responsibility to help them reach Draga, the highest Military Officer and Tavins mother. The trio races across dangerous terrain such as snowy mountain passes in order to avoid the Oleanders and Skinghasts that Rhusana has sent after them. Fie uses bone magic to keep the boys safe until they reach their destination. As Rhusana and her band of deadly trackers loom ever closer, the three fugitives must discover what they're each willing to sacrifice to save their own. To outrun and outwit the queen, the trio forge an uneasy alliance that is soon tested by old secrets, shifting allegiances, and forbidden feelings as Tavin and Fie develop romantic feelings for each other and Jasimir questions Tavin's loyalties. Family secrets and loyalties are tested at the end of the novel with a surprising concluding plot twist.

Characters

Main Characters 

 Fie (A Crow) - The feisty main character who wishes to see the Crow caste treated better within society and is willing to do anything to see it happen while having romantic feelings for Tavin despite his higher ranking in there  society she sees as wrong.
 Crown Prince Jasimir (A Phoenix) - The heir to the throne of Sabor who believes that his step mother, Queen Rhusana is plotting to kill his father to take the throne for herself and wants to foil and expose her plots which is why he seeks support of high-ranking members of society to help him move against her.
 Tavin (A Hawk) - the bodyguard, body double, and half brother of the Crown Prince Jasimir who is willing to do anything to see that Jasimir is safe and will sit on the throne for Tavin himself has no right to the crown, and he also has a romantic interest in Fie despite her lower ranking in society.
 Queen Rhusana (A Swan) - the manipulative wife to King Surimir that is plotting to kill him in order to take the crown and throne so she can dispose of the Crow caste.

Side Characters 

 King Surimir (A Phoenix)- King of Sabor and father of Prince Jasimir and the biological father of Tavin.
 Pa (Crow Chief/Witch)- father of Fie and the main Crow chieftain.
 Hangdog (Crow)- traitor and Fie's ex-boyfriend.
 Wretch (A Crow)- part of Fie's band of crows.
 Swain (A Crow)- part of Fie's band of crows.
 Madcap (A Crow)- part of Fie's band of crows.
 Viimo (A Vulture)- the hunter that Queen Rhusana hires to track down Prince Jasimir, Tavin, and Fie to intercept them before they rally the troops against her; however, Viimo has a change of heart at the very end.
 Draga (A Hawk)- Tavin's mother and the highest-ranking officer in the military.
 Barf- a gray Tabby Cat that was used as payment by Queen Rhusana for the Crows properly "disposing" of Prince Jasimir and Tavin's bodies after they both "caught the sinners plague" who adds a source of comedy amongst the drama.
 Oleander Gentry- a group from various castes who hate/hunt Crows Rhusana's minions that help assist in tracking down the prince, his body guard, and their Crow companion.
 Skinghast- A wicked undead being that Queen Rhusana controls and can only be defeated by fire.

Author 
Margaret Owen is the author of The Merciful Crow (2019) and its sequel The Faithless Hawk (2020). She is currently working on a new novel titled Little Thieves that will be released the summer of 2021. She had always dreamt of becoming an author and after attempts at other careers, finally became an author.

Awards/Nominations and Blurbs 

 Parents Choice Award Winner in 2019 -"This is a fantasy with a few, stable magical elements that effect the plot but don’t control it.  The author does not explain much; she reveals it gradually through Fie’s actions. With a wonderful protagonist and complex plotting, the denouement is surprising, exciting and tightly written. An absolutely stellar fantasy."
 2020 Young Adult Library Services Association (YALSA): A Division of the American Library Association, Best Fiction for Young Adults -"...this action-packed adventure fantasy"
 Hugo Award Nominee 2020
 One of the Winners for Goodreads Years Most Popular YA Debuts So Far in 2019 
 Kirkus Reviews- "Rich, harrowing, and unafraid to tackle discrimination—perfect for fans of Leigh Bardugo and Tomi Adeyemi."

References 

2019 fantasy novels
Young adult fantasy novels
Henry Holt and Company books